Guide to Kulchur is a non-fiction book by the American poet Ezra Pound. Published in London in July 1938 by Faber & Faber, the book examines 2,500 years of cultural history, beginning with the Analects of Confucius. The first chapter was published in Milan in June 1937 as a pamphlet, Confucius/Digest of the Analects, by Giovanni Scheiwiller.

A supporter of Benito Mussolini, Pound congratulates his friend Wyndham Lewis in the book for having "discovered" Adolf Hitler. "I hand it to him as a superior perception," he wrote. "Superior in relation to my own discovery of Mussolini." Lewis later rejected fascism.

Publication details
Pound, Ezra (1938). Guide to Kulchur. London: Faber & Faber.

References

Works cited
 
 Moody, A. David (2014). Ezra Pound: Poet. A Portrait of the Man and His Work. II: The Epic Years 1921–1939. Oxford: Oxford University Press.  
Pound, Ezra (1966) [1938]. Guide to Kulchur. London: Peter Owen.
 Redman, Tim (1991). Ezra Pound and Italian Fascism. Cambridge: Cambridge University Press. 

1938 non-fiction books
Works by Ezra Pound
Faber and Faber books